Marcus David Maron (born September 27, 1963) is an American stand-up comedian, podcaster, writer, actor, and musician.

In the 1990s and 2000s, Maron was a frequent guest on the Late Show with David Letterman and has appeared more than forty times on Late Night with Conan O'Brien, more than any other stand-up comedian. He hosted Comedy Central's Short Attention Span Theater from 1993 to 1994, replacing Jon Stewart. He was also a regular guest on Tough Crowd with Colin Quinn and hosted the short-lived 2002 American version of the British game show Never Mind the Buzzcocks on VH1. He was a regular on the left-wing radio network Air America from 2004 to 2009, hosting The Marc Maron Show and co-hosting Morning Sedition and Breakroom Live.

In September 2009, following the cancellation of Breakroom Live, Maron began hosting the twice-weekly podcast WTF with Marc Maron, interviewing comedians, authors, musicians, and celebrities in his garage in Highland Park, Los Angeles. Highlights include a 2010 episode with Louis C.K. that was rated the No. 1 podcast episode of all time by Slate magazine, a 2012 interview with comedian Todd Glass in which Glass publicly revealed that he was gay, and a 2015 interview with President Barack Obama.

From 2013 to 2016, he starred in his own IFC television comedy series, Maron, for which he also served as executive producer and an occasional writer. From 2017 to 2019, he co-starred in the Netflix comedy series GLOW. He also had a minor role in 2019's Joker and provided the voice of Mr. Snake in the DreamWorks Animation film The Bad Guys (2022).

Early life 
Maron was born in Jersey City, New Jersey, the son of mother Toby and father Barry Ralph Maron, an orthopedic surgeon. He has a younger brother, Craig.

Maron is from a Jewish family, originally from Poland and Ukraine, including Drohobych. He lived in Wayne, New Jersey until he was six. Maron's father joined the U.S. Air Force for two years for his medical residency in Alaska, and so Maron and his family moved there. When his father left the Air Force, he moved the family to Albuquerque, New Mexico and started a medical practice. Maron lived in Albuquerque from third grade through high school. He graduated from Highland High School.

In 1986, Maron graduated from Boston University with a B.A. in English literature.

Career 
Maron first performed stand-up in 1987 when he was 24 years old. His professional comedy career began at The Comedy Store in Los Angeles where he became an associate of Sam Kinison. He later moved to New York City and became part of the New York alternative comedy scene. During the summer of 1994, he appeared several times on Monday open-mic night, coordinated by Tracey Metzger, at the now-closed Greenwich Village location of the Boston Comedy Club. He auditioned unsuccessfully for the 1995 Saturday Night Live cast overhaul and attributes being passed over to being high during a meeting with show creator and producer Lorne Michaels.

Maron continued to be a stand-up comedian and also began to appear on television; his voice was used in episodes of Dr. Katz, Professional Therapist, and he hosted Short Attention Span Theater for a time. He also recorded half-hour specials for HBO and Comedy Central Presents as well as comedy showcases like the Cam Neely Foundation fundraiser, which also featured performers such as Jon Stewart, Denis Leary and Steven Wright. He frequently appeared in the live alternative stand-up series he had organized with Janeane Garofalo called Eating It, which used the rock bar Luna Lounge in New York's Lower East Side as its venue, from the 1990s until the building was razed in 2005.

His first one-man show, Jerusalem Syndrome, had an extended off-Broadway run in 2000 and was released in book form in 2001. In 2009, he began workshopping another one-man show, Scorching the Earth. According to Maron (in Scorching The Earth), these two shows "bookend" his relationship with his second wife, comic Mishna Wolff, which ended in a bitter divorce.

In May 2008, he toured with Eugene Mirman and Andy Kindler in Stand Uppity: Comedy That Makes You Feel Better About Yourself and Superior to Others. In January 2009, a collaboration with Sam Seder, which had begun in September 2007 as a weekly hour-long video webcast became Breakroom Live with Maron & Seder, produced by Air America. Until its cancellation in July 2009, the show was webcast live weekdays at 3 p.m. Eastern, with episodes archived for later viewing. In its final incarnation, the show was informal, taking place in the actual break room of Air America Media, with the cafeteria vending machines just off-camera. This meant occasional distractions when Air America staff and management alike would occasionally come in for food and drink. Maron and Seder held court in an online "post-show chat" with viewers, in an even less formal continuation of each webcast, after the credits had rolled.

Maron's stand-up act is marked by his commitment to self-revelation and cultural analysis. He is particularly known for relentless on-stage exploration of his own relationships with family, girlfriends, and other stand-up comedians whom he has known and befriended over his years in the business. In October 2013, Maron released his first hour-long special through Netflix titled, Marc Maron: Thinky Pain. Maron would follow this with another special titled, More Later, which was released in December 2015 through Epix.

Kliph Nesteroff's 2015 book The Comedians: Drunks, Thieves, Scoundrels and the History of American Comedy is dedicated to Maron.

Radio
From almost the first day of the liberal talk radio network Air America's broadcasts in 2004, Maron co-hosted Morning Sedition, a three-hour early-morning radio show with Mark Riley that aired weekdays from 6 a.m. to 9 a.m. Eastern time. The show was unique in the Air America lineup in its heavy reliance on both live and pre-produced sketch comedy, utilizing the talents of staff writers as well as the on-air hosts. The format was a left-leaning near-satire of typical morning "Buddy" radio programs, including recurring characters, interviews and listener call-in segments, and it attracted a loyal fan base.

As 2005 came to an end, it became known that Maron's contract would not be renewed on its December 1, 2005, end date because of problems with then Air America executive Danny Goldberg. Goldberg reportedly did not "get" the comedy or agree with the satiric and often angry tone set by Maron and other writers (Jim Earl and Kent Jones) for a morning drive-time show. On November 28, 2005, it was officially announced that Maron's contract had not been renewed. His last Morning Sedition broadcast was on December 16, 2005, and the show was discontinued shortly thereafter.

On February 28, 2006, Maron began hosting a nighttime radio program with Jim Earl as a sidekick for KTLK Progressive Talk 1150AM in Los Angeles called The Marc Maron Show from 10:00 pm until midnight PST. The program was frequently delayed (sometimes for over an hour) owing to KTLK's contractual agreement to broadcast local sports events that would often go into overtime. The Marc Maron Show was never nationally syndicated by Air America despite reported contractual clauses promising such. The show was streamed online live, but the show was not publicized, and the existence of the stream was not well promoted. 

On July 5, it was announced that Maron's final episode would be on July 14. A few days before that date, Maron bluntly discussed his long struggle with Air America Radio's executives on-air. In 2008, Marc and Sam Seder expanded their prior collaboration on a weekly hour-long video webcast (streamed at The Sam Seder Show website) into a daily show (and "post-show chat") produced by Air America Media called Maron v. Seder. The show became Breakroom Live with Maron & Seder starting in 2009 and could be viewed on Air America Media's website. On July 15, 2009, after less than one year, Air America Media canceled Breakroom Live. According to the show's hosts, the cancellation was for financial reasons. Ironically, the day before the cancellation, the show got some of the first real publicity it had ever received when MaximumFun.org posted its podcast of an interview with Maron on The Sound of Young America.

On the final Breakroom Live webcast, Maron said that this marked the third time since 2005 he'd been told by an executive at the network that his services would not be required in the immediate future. Co-host Sam Seder pointed out that this would be the end of his fourth show at Air America since the troubled network's inception.

WTF with Marc Maron podcast

Due to a failing comedic career, on September 1, 2009, Maron began a twice-weekly podcast called WTF with Marc Maron. In a free-form discussion, Maron and his guests touch on topics like the arc of the interviewees' careers, their shared past experiences, and stories from the road. As of 2020, Maron has released more than 1,000 episodes of the show, with notable guests, including President Barack Obama, Sir Paul McCartney, Robin Williams, Jerry Seinfeld, Chris Rock, Lorne Michaels, Leonardo DiCaprio, and Brad Pitt. The show has been noted for its influence on other long-form interview podcasts that emerged after its debut. In April 2021, it was announced that Maron and his producer Brendan McDonald would be the recipients of the first-ever Governors Award by the Podcast Academy for Excellence in Audio (The Ambies) for their work on WTF.

Film and television 
His only major film credit for many years was a small part credited as "angry promoter" in the 2000 Cameron Crowe film Almost Famous, in which he is first seen fighting with Noah Taylor's character and then yelling at and chasing after the main characters as they drive away on a bus, at which point he yells, "Lock the gates!" which is now used in the intro to his podcasts. He was also featured at the Luna Lounge in the 1997 mockumentary Who's the Caboose? starring Sarah Silverman and Sam Seder. In 2019, Maron starred in a Lynn Shelton-directed comedy film titled Sword of Trust. In 2020, Maron played publicist Ron Oberman opposite Johnny Flynn's young David Bowie in the movie Stardust.

In 2012, he provided the voice of Magnus Hammersmith in three episodes of Metalocalypse. Maron has made two guest appearances as himself on his longtime friend Louis C.K.'s show Louie, first in the third-season episode "Ikea/Piano Lesson" and then again in the fourth season episode "Pamela: Part 3".

Maron, a television series created by and starring Maron for a 10-episode first season, premiered on IFC on May 3, 2013. The show is loosely autobiographical, revolving around Maron's life as a twice-divorced sober comedian running a comedy podcast out of his garage but establishing many differences between the real-life Maron and the version of him on TV. As the executive producer and star of Maron, Maron appeared in all 51 episodes of the show from 2013 to 2016, portraying a fictionalized version of himself. The show ended in 2016 after four seasons on IFC. Maron directed two episodes of the show, "The Joke" and "Ex-Pod."

Maron played a supporting role in Todd Phillips's Joker origin story film Joker, starring Joaquin Phoenix as the title character, alongside Robert De Niro and Zazie Beetz.

In addition to his own show, Maron was the voice of the raccoon Randl on 12 episodes of the Nickelodeon show Harvey Beaks in 2015 and 2016. He appeared in the Netflix series Easy, playing a graphic novelist, Jacob Malco. Maron also appeared on two episodes of Girls in season four in 2015, playing New York City councilman Ed Duffield.

From 2017 to 2019, Maron co-starred in the Netflix comedy GLOW, for which he was nominated for multiple awards.

He was cast in a supporting role for the 2022 film To Leslie, playing alongside Andrea Riseborough, who was nominated for an Academy Award for Best Actress for her performance in the film.

Music 
In 2013, Maron played a guitar solo on the protest song and charity single "Party at the NSA" by electropop music duo Yacht. Inspired by the 2013 global surveillance disclosures, "Party at the NSA" critiques the state of governmental surveillance programs in the United States. Proceeds from the single benefit the international non-profit digital rights group Electronic Frontier Foundation. Previously, Maron said he was a fan of the band.

In an interview with KCRW, Maron stated, "I have no idea why they asked me to play guitar on the track. I'm only good at one thing on the guitar. It just so happens it was exactly the thing they needed."

Reviews for the solo were positive. IFC's Melissa Locker said "Marc Maron plays a mean guitar." Spins Chris Martins called the guitar solo a "shredfest" as well as "angular." The Stranger called it "a frequency-fraying guitar solo that's better than you'd expect, although it won't make J Mascis jealous."

Maron wrote and performed on the score for his film Sword of Trust.

Personal life 

Maron lived in Astoria, Queens through the 1990s and most of the 2000s, but moved back to Los Angeles in late 2009. Maron also speaks openly of his caring for numerous stray cats that he takes into his home. This has led to him to refer to his home, on the WTF Podcast, as the "Cat Ranch". After his cat Boomer went missing, Maron began incorporating the catchphrase "Boomer lives!" to the end of each podcast. Since then, he has one addition to the "Cat Ranch" by the name of Buster Kitten. LaFonda died in December 2019. After she passed, Maron briefly replaced "Boomer lives!" with "LaFonda lives!" for a few episodes of his podcast. Monkey died in August 2020. He now usually concludes his podcast with some guitar playing and the phrase "Boomer lives... LaFonda... Monkey... Cat angels everywhere!" Maron currently lives in Glendale, Los Angeles, with his two cats, Buster and Sammy.

Maron has spoken openly, both in his act and on his podcast, about his alcohol and drug abuse during the 1990s. Maron has been sober since August 9, 1999. Maron had a turbulent long-time friendship with fellow standup comic Louis CK but publicly disavowed CK after the November 2017 confirmation of CK's sexual misconduct, stating that CK had lied to him about the allegations in the past.

Maron has been married twice, once to Kimberly Reiss and once to Mishna Wolff, a former stand-up comedian. Both relationships have figured prominently in his act at various times. During numerous appearances at the Edinburgh Fringe festival in 2007, Maron riffed on his then-recent separation and divorce from Wolff.

On the October 14, 2013 episode of his podcast, Maron announced that he had broken up with his former fiancée, Jessica Sanchez. He then had a five-month relationship with Moon Zappa. More recently, he dated visual artist Sarah Cain for several years, breaking up with her in early 2019.

Starting in late 2019, he began making reference to his relationship with director Lynn Shelton. She was a guest on his podcast in both 2015 and 2018, and she directed the 2019 film Sword of Trust, which stars Maron and Michaela Watkins. Maron and Shelton were together until Shelton's abrupt death in May 2020.

Works or publications 
Books
 Maron, Marc. The Jerusalem Syndrome: My Life As a Reluctant Messiah. New York: Broadway Books, 2001. 
 Maron, Marc. Attempting Normal. New York: Spiegel & Grau, 2014. 
Maron, Marc and Brendan McDonald. Waiting for the Punch: Words to Live by from the WTF Podcast. New York: Flatiron Books, 2017. 

Comedy albums
 Maron, Marc. Not Sold Out. [Minneapolis, MN]: Stand Up Records, 2002.
 Maron, Marc. Tickets Still Available. [Richland, MN]: Stand Up! Records, 2006.
 Maron, Marc. Final Engagement. [Minneapolis, MN.]: Stand Up! Records, 2009.
 Maron, Marc. This Has to Be Funny. [New York?]: Comedy Central Records, 2011.
 Maron, Marc, Lance Bangs and Kathy Welch. Thinky pain. [Burbank, CA]: New Wave Dynamics, 2013.
Maron, Marc, Too Real [Minneapolis, MN]: 800 Pound Gorilla Records, 2018

Comedy Specials
 Comedy Central Presents New York City, New York: 1998 (Season 1, episode 2)
 Comedy Central Presents (2007) (Season 11, episode 1)
 HBO Comedy Half-Hour (1995) (Season 2, episode 5)
 Thinky Pain (2013)
 More Later (2015)
 Too Real (2017)
 End Times Fun (2020)
 From Bleak to Dark (2023)

Podcasts
 WTF with Marc Maron

Filmography

Accolades

In 2022, Maron's WTF podcast episode featuring Robin Williams from April 26, 2010, was selected by the Library of Congress for preservation in the United States National Recording Registry as being "culturally, historically, or aesthetically significant."

References

Further reading

External links

 WTF with Marc Maron
 

1963 births
Living people
American comedy writers
American male comedians
American male film actors
American male television actors
American people of Polish-Jewish descent
American people of Ukrainian-Jewish descent
American podcasters
American stand-up comedians
American talk radio hosts
Boston University College of Arts and Sciences alumni
Jewish American comedians
Jewish American male actors
Male actors from Los Angeles
Male actors from Jersey City, New Jersey
Writers from Albuquerque, New Mexico
People from Astoria, Queens
People from Wayne, New Jersey
Showrunners
Male actors from Albuquerque, New Mexico
Comedians from California
Comedians from New Mexico
Comedians from New Jersey
Comedians from New York City
American male television writers
20th-century American comedians
20th-century American male actors
21st-century American comedians
21st-century American male actors
Stand Up! Records artists
Jewish American male comedians
Dethklok members
21st-century American Jews